InFiné is a French record label directed by Alexandre Cazac and Yannick Matray. Coming from electronic music, the label usually goes off the beaten path, from classical music to ambient, through club or pop music.

History
The idea of the label InFiné came true in February 2005 when Alexandre Cazac attends a concert by Francesco Tristano at Théâtre des Bouffes du Nord in Paris. The pianist covered "Strings of Life", a founding track of Detroit techno music, produced by Derrick May.
 
Officially, the label is born in January 2006 when Sebastien Devaud and Yannick Matray join Alexandre Cazac. Their first release is indeed the track "Strings of Life" interpreted by Francesco Tristano, with remixes from the German producers Apparat and Kiki.

In 2007, Julien Gagnebien goes into partnership with InFiné and opens an office in Berlin, bringing to life the label's intent to be international.

In 2007, Sebastien Devaud aka Agoria leaves the label to dedicate himself to his DJ career.

The label’s approach is transversal and multidisciplinary. InFiné intends to promote meetings between styles and generations, but also between disciplines. It uses electronic music as a vehicle for promoting uncharted musical territories where heritage and avant-garde are mixed. On one hand we find a generation of electronic producers (Rone, Danton Eeprom, Oxia, Clara Moto, Cubenx, Arandel), on the other hand musiciens from jazz, world, classic or contemporary music (Francesco Tristano, Bachar Mar-Khalifé, Aufgang, Pedro Soler, Bruce Brubaker).

In October 2008, InFiné organized at la Cité de la Musique in Paris one of the first meeting between a classical ensemble and artists from the electronic music scene: it is called Versus. The project set together the legendary producer Carl Craig, the mythical Moritz Von Oswald and the philharmonic orchestra Les Siècles directed by François-Xavier Roth for an exceptional programme with compositions from Steve Reich, Bruno Mantovani and pieces by Carl Craig arranged and interpreted by the pianist Francesco Tristano.

In 2011, InFiné is the first label invited at Gaîté Lyrique in Paris. During one entire week, the label is given musical and visual carte blanche to exploit the place. Parties, concerts, projections, installations and even sound design of the venue mark this week dedicated to the label. Later, in 2015, Francesco Tristano and Bruce Brubaker performed a 2-piano show at Gaîté Lyrique that was broadcast live on Arte.

InFiné is often a pioneer in the field of new digital technologies and regularly cooperates with IRCAM. For instance, the affiliated artists are implicated in the research in the field of sound design. It was even the first label to produce a musical session in virtual reality via Oculus Rift. In early November 2014, the label announced the release of a new Rone album, Creatures, to be released on February 9, 2015 on Infiné.

In 2015, Alexandre Cazac was involved in the Stems' panel for Native Instruments at Sonar Festival in Barcelona as long as Carl Craig, Luciano and Kerri Chandler, who debated about the new audio format created by Native Instruments, and the way it can redefine DJ practice and live music performance.

Finally, each year is marked by the organisation of the Workshop InFiné at la Carrière du Normandoux near Poitiers in France. Since 2009, the label has put a lot into this festival with the objective of creating a family spirit around artists residences. This festival became a laboratory for the development of musical and art projects. This is how collaborations between Vanessa Wagner and Murcof, Charlemagne Palestine and Mondkopf, or Bernard Szajner, Yro Yto and Almeeva among others were born.

Artists

Discography

LPs

Compilations

References

French record labels
Electronic music record labels